Allochrocebus is a primate genus including the terrestrial guenons: the L'Hoest's monkey, the Preuss's monkey, and the sun-tailed monkey.

Taxonomy & systematics
Formerly included in genus Cercopithecus, the three species of terrestrial guenons are now included in genus Allochrocebus.

References

Primate genera
Taxa named by Daniel Giraud Elliot
Terrestrial guenons
Taxa described in 1913